Yuliya Beygelzimer and Çağla Büyükakçay were the defending champions. However, they lost in the first round to Diana Buzean and Réka-Luca Jani.

Ekaterine Gorgodze and Nastja Kolar won the title, defeating Oleksandra Korashvili and Elitsa Kostova in the final, 6–4, 7–6(7–5).

Seeds

Draw

References 
 Draw

Ankara Cup - Doubles
Ankara Cup